Events from the year 1628 in Denmark.

Incumbents 

 Monarch - Christian IV

Events 
22 August – Danish forces were defeated in the Battle of Wolgast

Births 

18 April – Ludvig Rosenkrantz, nobleman and civil servant, the first baron in Norway (died 1685).

Deaths 
28 June – Jens Munk, navigator and explorer (born 1579)

References 

 
Denmark
Years of the 17th century in Denmark